Bluemull Sound is the strait between Unst and Yell in Shetland's North Isles. A ferry service crosses it regularly. Cullivoe is on the Yell side, and the island of Linga lies in the strait.

The "world's first community-owned tidal power generator" became operational in Bluemull Sound in April 2014. The turbine is a 30 kW Nova Innovation device, owned by the North Yell Development Council  and is connected to the local grid by 1 km subsea cable; helping power an ice house and up to 30 local homes. A 100 kW tidal turbine was connected in August 2016.

The Sound was referred to as "Blumel sound" in early 1800 nautical references It was later referred to as Bluemull Sound in 1865. It is unclear why there is such a discrepancy in the name.

References

Straits of Scotland
Landforms of Shetland
Unst
Yell, Shetland